Scurlockstown is a townland in County Westmeath, Ireland.

Scurlockstown is one of 8 townlands of the civil parish of Portloman in the barony of Corkaree in the Province of Leinster. The neighbouring townlands are: Monroe to the north, Portloman to the east, Ballard and Lugnagullagh to the south, Johnstown to the south–west and Monroe or Johnstown (Nugent) to the north–west.

In the 1911 census of Ireland there were 3 houses and 11 inhabitants in the townland.

There are other townlands with the name Scurlockstown, in County Meath, and County Westmeath.

References

External links
Map of Scurlockstown at openstreetmap.org
Scurlockstown at The IreAtlas Townland Data Base
Scurlockstown at Townlands.ie
Scurlockstown at the Placenames Database of Ireland

Townlands of County Westmeath